The 1972 Vermont gubernatorial election took place on November 7, 1972. The incumbent Republican Gov. Deane C. Davis was not a candidate for re-election to another term as Governor of Vermont. The Democratic nominee, Thomas P. Salmon, defeated the Republican nominee, Luther F. Hackett, to become his successor. Future U.S. senator and presidential candidate Bernie Sanders ran as a member of the Liberty Union Party.

Republican primary

Results

Democratic primary

Results

General election

Results

References

Vermont
1972
Gubernatorial
Bernie Sanders